Naumkino is a rural locality (a village) in Balyklykulsky Selsoviet, Aurgazinsky District, Bashkortostan, Russia. The population was 699 as of 2010. There are 7 streets.

Geography 
Naumkino is located 17 km southwest of Tolbazy (the district's administrative centre) by road. Amzya is the nearest rural locality.

References 

Rural localities in Aurgazinsky District